(born 29 March 1998) is a Japanese actress from Saitama.

Career
Konishi first became interested in an acting career after watching Sion Sono's film Himizu in junior high school. She subsequently appeared in a self-produced film at university, and began to send her resume to entertainment agencies and attended auditions. After meeting film director Masaoki Hirota, she was cast as the heroine in his 2020 film , which became her first commercial film appearance. She was also cast as the heroine in Takashi Miike's First Love, being chosen out of 3,000 applicants in auditions in 2019. She also appeared on the cover and the opening gravure of the manga magazine Young King, for the 2 March 2020 issue, published by Shōnen Gahōsha. 

Konishi has stated that she is not affiliated with an entertainment agency, choosing instead to "prioritize the approaches she wants to develop in her work." She does however have a manager. She was also nominated for the 14th Asian Film Awards Award for Best Newcomer that year.

Filmography

Film

Television drama

Web drama

Stage performance

Music video

References

External links
 

People from Saitama (city)
1998 births
Living people
21st-century Japanese actresses
Japanese film actresses
Japanese television actresses